The Northeastern Railroad was a   gauge railroad that served South Carolina in the second half of the 19th century.

History
Chartered in 1851, it was completed in 1856 and ran from Charleston, South Carolina, to Florence, South Carolina, connecting with the Wilmington and Manchester Railroad.  

The lines original Charleston station was located on Chapel Street near what is now the Charleston Historic District. 

The Northeastern Railroad jointly leased the Central Railroad of South Carolina with Wilmington, Columbia and Augusta Railroad.

By the late 1880s, it was one of the larger carriers based in South Carolina, with 24 locomotives and nearly 350 cars.

In 1877, the Ashley River Railroad was built from the line in North Charleston which connected the Northeastern Railroad to the Plant System of railroads (which extended further into the southeast and to Florida).

The Northeastern Railroad became part of the Atlantic Coast Line Railroad in 1898.  It became a segment of the Atlantic Coast Line's main line.  Under the Atlantic Coast Line's ownership, the original Charleston station was replaced in 1905 by Charleston Union Station (which was located at East Bay and Columbus Streets).  Charleston Union Station burned down in 1947 and the Atlantic Coast Line built a new station in 1956, which was then replaced by the current North Charleston station in 2018.

In 1967, the Atlantic Coast Line merged with its rival, the Seaboard Air Line Railroad (who also operated  line through Charleston).  The merged company was named the Seaboard Coast Line Railroad.
In 1980, the Seaboard Coast Line's parent company merged with the Chessie System, creating the CSX Corporation.  The CSX Corporation initially operated the Chessie and Seaboard Systems separately until 1986, when they were merged into CSX Transportation.

The line remains in service today as part of CSX's A Line (Charleston Subdivision).

Station Listing

See also
Charleston Subdivision

References

Defunct South Carolina railroads
Railway companies established in 1856
Railway companies disestablished in 1898
5 ft gauge railways in the United States
Predecessors of the Atlantic Coast Line Railroad
1856 establishments in South Carolina
1898 disestablishments in South Carolina